Jean-François Rousset (born 9 September 1952) is a French politician from La République En Marche!. He became Member of Parliament for the Aveyron's 3rd constituency in the 2022 French legislative election.

See also 

 List of deputies of the 16th National Assembly of France

References 

1952 births
Living people
Deputies of the 16th National Assembly of the French Fifth Republic
21st-century French politicians
La République En Marche! politicians
Members of Parliament for Aveyron